Radio Happy Lagoon (or Radio Hapi Lagun in Pijin) is a provincial radio station broadcast by the Solomon Islands Broadcasting Corporation in the Western Province. It operates from the provincial capital, Gizo, on 945 kHz in the Medium Wave Band.

References

Radio stations in the Solomon Islands